Peter was a nobleman in the Kingdom of Hungary, who served as Judge royal in 1183, during the reign of Béla III of Hungary. According to a non-authentic charter, he already once held the position in 1171.

References

Sources
  Markó, László: A magyar állam főméltóságai Szent Istvántól napjainkig – Életrajzi Lexikon (The High Officers of the Hungarian State from Saint Stephen to the Present Days – A Biographical Encyclopedia) (2nd edition); Helikon Kiadó Kft., 2006, Budapest; .
  Zsoldos, Attila (2011). Magyarország világi archontológiája, 1000–1301 ("Secular Archontology of Hungary, 1000–1301"). História, MTA Történettudományi Intézete. Budapest. 

Judges royal
12th-century Hungarian people